New Maryland is a civil parish in York County, New Brunswick, Canada.

For governance purposes it is divided between the village of New Maryland the local service district of the parish of New Maryland, both of which are members of Regional Service Commission 11 (RSC11). The LSD further includes the special service areas of Howorth and Nasonworth.

Origin of name
The parish probably came from members of the Maryland Loyalists Battalion who settled in the area. Ganong states that the name came from the settlement of Maryland.

History
New Maryland was erected in 1850 from Kingsclear Parish and unassigned territory.

Boundaries
New Maryland Parish is bounded:

 on the northeast by the city of Fredericton;
 on the southeast by the Sunbury County line;
 on the south by the Charlotte County line;
 on the northwest by a line beginning on the Charlotte County line about 3.6 kilometres west of Big Kedron Lake and about 4 kilometres east of Route 3 and running northeasterly parallel to the Sunbury County line until it reaches Fredericton.

Communities
Communities at least partly within the parish. bold indicates an incorporated municipality

  Beaver Dam
 Charters Settlement
 Howorth Acres
  Nasonworth
  New Maryland
  Rooth

Bodies of water
Bodies of water at least partly within the parish.

  North Branch Oromocto River
 Lyons Stream
 Nasonworth Millstream
 South Branch Rusagonis Stream
 Yoho Stream
 Big Kedron Lake
 Little Lake
 Little Kedron Lake
 Mud Lake
 Oromocto Lake
 The Basin

Islands
Islands at least partly within the parish.
 Camp Jersey Island

Other notable places
Parks, historic sites, and other noteworthy places at least partly within the parish.
 University of New Brunswick Wildlife Refuge

Demographics
Parish population total does not include  village of New Maryland

Population
Population trend

Language
Mother tongue (2016)

See also
List of parishes in New Brunswick

Notes

References

Parishes of York County, New Brunswick
Local service districts of York County, New Brunswick